Jacques Albin Simon Collin de Plancy (28 January 1793 in Plancy-l'Abbaye – 1881 in Paris) was a French occultist, demonologist and writer. He published several works on occultism and demonology.

Biography

He was born Jacques Albin Simon Collin on 28 (in some sources 30) January 1793 in Plancy (presently Plancy-l'Abbaye), the son of Edme-Aubin Collin and Marie-Anne Danton, the sister of Georges-Jacques Danton who was executed the year after Jacques was born. He later added the aristocratic de Plancy himself – an addition which later caused accusations against his son in his career as a diplomat. He was a free-thinker influenced by Voltaire. He worked as a printer and publisher in Plancy-l'Abbaye and Paris. Between 1830 and 1837, he resided in Brussels, and then in the Netherlands, before he returned to France after having converted to the Catholic religion.

Collin de Plancy followed the tradition of many previous demonologists of cataloguing demons by name and title of nobility, as it happened with grimoires like Pseudomonarchia Daemonum and The Lesser Key of Solomon. In 1818, his best known work, Dictionnaire Infernal, was published. In 1863, some images were added that made it famous: imaginative drawings concerning the appearance of certain demons. In 1822, it was advertised as:

"Anecdotes of the nineteenth new century or historiettes, recent anecdotes, features and words little known, singular adventures, various quotations, bringings together and curious parts, to be used for the history of customs and the spirit of the century when we live compared with the last centuries."

It is considered a major work documenting beings, characters, books, deeds and causes which pertain to the manifestations and magic of trafficking with Hell; divinations, occult sciences, grimoires, marvels, errors, prejudices, traditions, folktales, the various superstitions, and generally all manner of marvellous, surprising, mysterious, and supernatural beliefs.

By the end of 1830, he ostensibly became an enthusiastic Catholic, much to the confusion of his former admirers and detractors. In 1846, he published a two-volume work entitled Dictionnaire Sciences Occultes et des Idées superstitieuses, another listing of demons. The set cost 16 francs.

Jacques Collin de Plancy was the father of Victor Collin de Plancy (1853–1924), who, for nearly a decade, starting in 1884, was French Minister to Korea and whose collected art works and books became part of the core of the Korean collections of the French Bibliothèque Nationale and the Musée Guimet in Paris.

Bibliography

References

Further reading 

 Simon, Ed. 2022. Pandemonium: A Visual History of Demonology. ABRAMS.

External links
 Dictionnaire infernal: ou Répertoire universel des êtres, des personnages, 1853 at Google Books, PDF download available
 Réalité de la magie et des apparitions: ou, Contre-poison du Dictionnaire, 1819 at Google Books, PDF download available
 Dictionnaire infernal, ou, Recherches et anecdotes, sur les démons, les, 1818 at Google Books, PDF download available
   Dictionnaire infernal, ou Recherches et anecdotes sur les démons, 1844 at Google Books, PDF download available
 Dictionnaire des sciences occultes: ou, Répertoire universel des êtres, des, 1848 at Google Books, PDF download available
 

1793 births
1881 deaths
Converts to Roman Catholicism from atheism or agnosticism
French occultists
19th-century French Jesuits
19th-century occultists
Demonologists